André Salah Sakakini (born 23 May 1957) is an Egyptian equestrian. He competed at the 1988, 1992, 2000 and the 2004 Summer Olympics.

References

1957 births
Living people
Egyptian male equestrians
Olympic equestrians of Egypt
Equestrians at the 1988 Summer Olympics
Equestrians at the 1992 Summer Olympics
Equestrians at the 2000 Summer Olympics
Equestrians at the 2004 Summer Olympics
Sportspeople from Alexandria